Sleeping Through the War is the fourth studio album by American band All Them Witches. It was released in February 2017 under New West Records.

Track listing

Charts

Personnel
All Them Witches
Ben McLeod - guitar, bass, Mellotron, percussion
Allan Van Cleave - organ, piano, Mellotron, Fender Rhodes electric piano
Charles Michael Parks, Jr. - bass, vocals, guitar, Mellotron, percussion, loops
Robby Staebler - drums, congas
Additional personnel
Caitlin Rose - vocals (tracks 1, 4-6)
Erin Rae - vocals (tracks 1, 4-6)
Tristen Gaspardek - vocals (tracks 1, 4-6)
Dave Cobb - percussion (track 3)
Mickey Raphael - harmonica (track 8)

Accolades

References

2017 albums
New West Records albums